Saanich is an anglicization of the name of the Saanich people or W̱SÁNEĆ. It may refer to:

the Saanich people, a group of indigenous peoples in British Columbia, Canada
the Saanich dialect, a subdialect of North Straits Salish

Places
the Saanich Peninsula, a region immediately north of Victoria, British Columbia, and the namesake of the three suburbs of that city located there:
Saanich, British Columbia, a district municipality on Vancouver Island in British Columbia, within the Greater Victoria area
Central Saanich, British Columbia
North Saanich, British Columbia

Electoral districts
Saanich and the Islands, a defunct provincial electoral district 1966–2001
Saanich South, a provincial electoral district 2001-
Saanich North and the Islands, a provincial electoral district 2001-
Saanich—Gulf Islands, a federal electoral district 1988–
Esquimalt—Saanich, a defunct federal electoral district 1953–1988
Esquimalt—Saanich—Sooke, a federal electoral district 2014-, formerly named "Saanich—Esquimalt—Juan de Fuca"
Saanich (electoral district), a provincial electoral district in the Canadian province of British Columbia

See also
Saanichton, a village in Central Saanich, BC